The 2019 Phoenix Pulse Fuel Masters season was the fourth season of the franchise in the Philippine Basketball Association (PBA).

Key dates

2018
December 16: The 2018 PBA draft took place in Midtown Atrium, Robinson Place Manila.

Draft picks

Roster

Philippine Cup

Eliminations

Standings

Game log

|-bgcolor=ccffcc
| 1
| January 16
| Meralco
| W 93–92 (OT)
| Justin Chua (24)
| JC Intal (16)
| JC Intal (6)
| Smart Araneta Coliseum
| 1–0
|-bgcolor=ccffcc
| 2
| January 19
| TNT
| W 93–84 (OT)
| Matthew Wright (23)
| Jason Perkins (15)
| Intal, Mallari, Wright (4)
| Ynares Center
| 2–0
|-bgcolor=ccffcc
| 3
| January 23
| Columbian
| W 108–98
| Matthew Wright (22)
| Jason Perkins (11)
| LA Revilla (7)
| Smart Araneta Coliseum
| 3–0

|-bgcolor=ccffcc
| 4
| February 1
| Blackwater
| W 114–95
| Calvin Abueva (22)
| Calvin Abueva (14)
| Matthew Wright (7)
| Ynares Center
| 4–0
|-bgcolor=ccffcc
| 5
| February 8
| NLEX
| W 83–82
| Matthew Wright (17)
| Abueva, Perkins (11)
| Matthew Wright (6)
| Mall of Asia Arena
| 5–0
|-bgcolor=ffcccc
| 6
| February 10
| Rain or Shine
| L 94–98 (OT)
| Jason Perkins (27)
| Calvin Abueva (12)
| Matthew Wright (5)
| Smart Araneta Coliseum
| 5–1
|-bgcolor=ccffcc
| 7
| February 27
| NorthPort
| W 98–96
| Matthew Wright (22)
| Justin Chua (9)
| Matthew Wright (5)
| Smart Araneta Coliseum
| 6–1

|-bgcolor=ccffcc
| 8
| March 1
| Alaska
| W 94–80
| Calvin Abueva (21)
| Calvin Abueva (16)
| Alex Mallari (6)
| Mall of Asia Arena
| 7–1
|-bgcolor=ccffcc
| 9
| March 6
| Magnolia
| W 89–87
| Calvin Abueva (24)
| Calvin Abueva (13)
| Matthew Wright (6)
| Smart Araneta Coliseum
| 8–1
|-bgcolor=ffcccc
| 10
| March 10
| Barangay Ginebra
| L 97–100
| Calvin Abueva (15)
| Calvin Abueva (11)
| Matthew Wright (10)
| Smart Araneta Coliseum
| 8–2
|-bgcolor=ccffcc
| 11
| March 16
| San Miguel
| W 96–93
| Matthew Wright (25)
| Jason Perkins (10)
| Alex Mallari (6)
| Panabo Multi-Purpose Tourism, Cultural, and Sports Center
| 9–2

Playoffs

Bracket

Game log

|-bgcolor=ccffcc
| 1
| April 7
| Alaska
| W 91–76
| Jason Perkins (31)
| Calvin Abueva (11)
| Matthew Wright (6)
| Mall of Asia Arena
| 1–0

|-bgcolor=ffcccc
| 1
| April 13
| San Miguel
| L 88–100
| Matthew Wright (22)
| Calvin Abueva (21)
| Calvin Abueva (5)
| Mall of Asia Arena
| 0–1
|-bgcolor=ffcccc
| 2
| April 15
| San Miguel
| L 82–92
| Calvin Abueva (16)
| Calvin Abueva (10)
| Calvin Abueva (6)
| Smart Araneta Coliseum
| 0–2
|-bgcolor=ccffcc
| 3
| April 21
| San Miguel
| W 92–90
| Abueva, Wright (18)
| Calvin Abueva (13)
| Calvin Abueva (5)
| Smart Araneta Coliseum
| 1–2
|-bgcolor=ffcccc
| 4
| April 23
| San Miguel
| L 91–114
| Calvin Abueva (19)
| Calvin Abueva (15)
| Abueva, Dennison, Jazul, Wright (3)
| Cuneta Astrodome
| 1–3
|-bgcolor=ffcccc
| 5
| April 23
| San Miguel
| L 91–114
| Matthew Wright (20)
| Justin Chua (11)
| LA Revilla (6)
| Cuneta Astrodome
| 1–4

Commissioner's Cup

Eliminations

Standings

Game log

|-bgcolor=ccffcc
| 1
| May 31
| Blackwater
| W 103–98
| Matthew Wright (22)
| Robert Dozier (16)
| Matthew Wright (6)
| Mall of Asia Arena
| 1–0

|-bgcolor=ffcccc
| 2
| June 2
| TNT
| L 88–114
| Matthew Wright (21)
| Robert Dozier (12)
| LA Revilla (5)
| Ynares Center
| 1–1
|-bgcolor=ffcccc
| 3
| June 7
| Meralco
| L 95–101
| Matthew Wright (20)
| Jason Perkins (13)
| LA Revilla (5)
| Smart Araneta Coliseum
| 1–2
|-bgcolor=ffcccc
| 4
| June 9
| Rain or Shine
| L 82–89
| Richard Howell (27)
| Richard Howell (11)
| Jazul, Wright (5)
| Ynares Center
| 1–3
|-bgcolor=ccffcc
| 5
| June 15
| Alaska
| W 78–76
| Richard Howell (24)
| Richard Howell (29)
| Matthew Wright (5)
| Smart Araneta Coliseum
| 2–3
|-bgcolor=ffcccc
| 6
| June 22
| Magnolia
| L 96–99
| Richard Howell (36)
| Richard Howell (20)
| Matthew Wright (8)
| Cuneta Astrodome
| 2–4
|-bgcolor=ccffcc
| 7
| June 26
| NorthPort
| W 97–87
| Matthew Wright (28)
| Richard Howell (15)
| Alex Mallari (7)
| Smart Araneta Coliseum
| 3–4
|-bgcolor=ccffcc
| 8
| June 28
| Barangay Ginebra
| W 111–103
| Matthew Wright (32)
| Richard Howell (21)
| Matthew Wright (6)
| Smart Araneta Coliseum
| 4–4

|-bgcolor=ffcccc
| 9
| July 6
| Columbian
| L 98–100
| Richard Howell (35)
| Richard Howell (23)
| RJ Jazul (9)
| Mall of Asia Arena
| 4–5
|-bgcolor=ffcccc
| 10
| July 10
| San Miguel
| L 108–128
| Richard Howell (15)
| Richard Howell (14)
| Jazul, Mallari (6)
| Smart Araneta Coliseum
| 4–6
|-bgcolor=ffcccc
| 11
| July 12
| NLEX
| L 85–87
| RJ Jazul (20)
| Richard Howell (8)
| Jazul, Wright (5)
| Cuneta Astrodome
| 4–7

Governors' Cup

Eliminations

Standings

Transactions

Free agent signings

Awards

References

Phoenix Super LPG Fuel Masters seasons
Phoenix Pulse Fuel Masters